In the final, Sears and Dwight won in five sets against Taylor and Slocum.

Draw

References 
 

Men's Doubles
U.S. National Championships (tennis) by year – Men's doubles